Jennifer Rachael Zigrino (born January 8, 1987) is an American comedian, singer and actress. Zigrino had supporting roles in the comedy films Fifty Shades of Black (2016) and Bad Santa 2 (2016).

Career

Zigrino was a guest on @midnight, Conan and Comedy Central Stand-Up Presents in 2017, and Live from Here in 2018.

Zigrino released her debut album named JZ's New Album in March 2017.

Zigrino was a writer on TV shows FabUless (2019) and The Filling Is Mutual (2017).

References

External links 
 

1987 births
Living people
American stand-up comedians
21st-century American comedians
Comedians from Minnesota
American women comedians
Stand Up! Records artists
21st-century American women
American people of Italian descent
American people of Russian-Jewish descent